Osipov, Osipova (feminine; Осипова), or Ossipoff is a Russian surname that is derived from the male given name Osip and literally means Osip's. Notable people with the surname include:

 Afanasiy Osipov (1928–2017), Soviet painter and People's Artist of the RSFSR 
 Alexei Osipov (born 1938), Russian Orthodox theologian and professor
 Alexander Osipov (1920-1945), Soviet aircraft pilot and Hero of the Soviet Union
 Eskandar Shura Ossipoff, Assyrian boxer in the 1948 Olympics
 Fyodor Osipov (1902-1989), Soviet army officer and Full Cavalier of the Order of Glory 
 Gennady Osipov (born 1929), Soviet sociologist and academician
 Gennady Simeonovich Osipov (1948-?), Russian scientist in Artificial Intelligence, professor
 Igor Osipov (born 1973), Russian naval officer
 Ilya V. Osipov (born 1975), Computer scientist, tech entrepreneur
 Irina Osipova (born 1981), Russian basketball player
 Mariya Osipova (1908–1999), Soviet World War II partisan, Hero of the Soviet Union 
 Maxim Osipov (disambiguation), several people
 Natalia Osipova (born 1985), Russian ballerina
 Nikolai Osipov (1901-1945), Russian balalaika virtuoso, conductor, pedagogue, and People's Artist
 N. P. Osipov (1751-1799), Russian writer, poet, and translator
 Taisiya Osipova (1984), Russian opposition activist
 Vasily Osipov (1917-1991), Soviet aircraft pilot and double Hero of the Soviet Union 
 Vladimir Ossipoff (1907–1998), American architect best known for his works in Hawaii
 Vladimir Osipov (1938–2020), Russian writer and dissident
 Yelena Osipova (born 1945) Russian artist and activist
 Yury Osipov (born 1936), President of the Russian Academy of Sciences since 1991

See also
 Osip, people carrying the name  

Russian-language surnames
Patronymic surnames
Surnames from given names